Strmec Podravski is a village in the municipality of Petrijanec, of Varaždin County, Croatia. The village had 663 inhabitants in the 2011 census.

Strmec has a memorial cross to the victims of World War II and the post-war period of the communist Yugoslav era.

References

External links 
 Strmec Podravski

Populated places in Varaždin County
Romani communities in Croatia